Wooster Street may refer to:
 Wooster Street (Manhattan) in SoHo (Manhattan), New York City, New York
 Wooster Street (New Haven) in Wooster Square, New Haven, Connecticut
 Wooster Street in Bowling Green, Ohio (part of Ohio State Route 64)
 Wooster Street in Shelton, Connecticut (part of Connecticut Route 108)